ABC HD may refer to:
 ABC HD (Australia), a high definition simulcast of television channel ABC in Australia
 ABC HD (United States), a high definition simulcast of television channel ABC in the United States